Andrew Thompson (born 3 November 1987 in Byron Bay, New South Wales), is an Australian racing driver.

Racing career

Karts
He has a successful career in junior karting. His biggest win was the Australian National Sprint Kart Championship - Junior Piston Port in 2002.

Formula Ford

Thompson's circuit racing career began in Formula Ford where in the 2004 season placed him into the then new Spectrum 010 chassis and finished eleventh in his only full-time season in the Australian Formula Ford Championship.

V8 Supercar

Dick Johnson Racing
2005 saw a partial season in Formula Ford as he focused on making the transition to V8 Supercar. 2006 saw his V8 Supercar debut racing in Dick Johnson Racing's three car team in the second tier Fujitsu V8 Supercars Series alongside teammates Grant Denyer and Marcus La Delle. Thompson finished the season in eighth position, one spot ahead of Denyer. His season highlight was winning the sixth round of the series at Mount Panorama, winning both races at the meeting where Mark Porter was killed.

DJR did not run a team in the Fujitsu series in 2007 but Thompson moved across to the series champions, Howard Racing but only completed a partial season with the team. Thompson did however take two further wins at the third round of the series at Winton Motor Raceway.

Thompson returned to Dick Johnson Racing for the endurance race season where he co-drove with Alex Davison in the team's second car. While no points were received at the Sandown 500, Bathurst was a different story with the #18 Falcon racing well all day with Davison on the fringe of the fight for the lead at races end. Eighth was an excellent reward for the duo, backing up team leaders Steven Johnson and Will Davison who finished third.

Paul Weel Racing

There was much speculation about Thompson joining Ford Rising Stars Racing full-time for season 2008, so it was a slight surprise when Paul Weel Racing announced Thompson would drive for the team in 2008 after the team had previously announced it would be closing and selling its franchises.

Rod Nash Racing

In 2009, Thompson joined Tony D'Alberto in the #55 The Bottle-O Racing Commodore for the endurance events at Phillip Island and Bathurst. At Phillip Island, the team finished in 15th Position and Bathurst the team finished in the top 10, in 10th Position.

Bundaberg Red Racing Team

Thompson rejoined the series full-time for the 2010 Season, joining Walkinshaw Racing to drive the team's #10 Bundaberg Red Commodore. The year was extremely disappointing, with Thompson finishing 30th, behind numerous part-time drivers. Thompson left the team at season's end.

Triple Eight Race Engineering

For 2011, Thompson joined Team Vodafone for the endurance events. This led to the team entering a Monster Energy backed car in the Fujitsu V8 series. At the endurance events, Thompson was paired with two-time V8 Supercar champion, Jamie Whincup. At Phillip Island, the #88 Commodore finished in 2nd Place, behind the team's #888 Commodore of Craig Lowndes and Mark Skaife, however at Bathurst Thompson and Whincup finished in 21st position due to Electrical issues. Thompson however won the Fujitsu Series for the team.

Career results

Complete Bathurst 1000 results

References

External links
 Driver Database profile

Supercars Championship drivers
1987 births
Living people
Formula Ford drivers
Racing drivers from New South Wales
Racing drivers from Queensland
Sportspeople from the Gold Coast, Queensland
Dick Johnson Racing drivers